Odivelas Futebol Clube Is an amateur futsal team based in Odivelas, Portugal. It plays in Portuguese Futsal First Division.

Futsal clubs in Portugal